Zin is a Burmese name.

Notable people with the name include:

Claudio Zin (born 1945), Italian-Argentinian physician and politician
Eaindra Kyaw Zin (born 1977), Burmese actress and model
Swe Zin Htet (born 1999), Burmese model
Irene Zin Mar Myint (born 1990), Burmese pop singer
Kyaw Zin Phyo (born 1993), Burmese footballer
A Zin Latt (born 1981), Burmese politician and physician 
Kyaw Zin, Burmese swimmer
Hernán Zin (born 1971), war correspondent, writer, producer and filmmaker of Italian-Argentinian
Swe Zin Htet (born 1999), Burmese model
Stan Zin (born 1958), Canadian economist

Surnames of Argentine origin
Burmese-language surnames
Burmese-language given names
Surnames of Burmese origin